Dmitry "Shok" Shakuta (born August 7, 1980) is a Belarusian Muay Thai super middleweight kickboxer fighting out of Minsk, Belarus for the SK-55 gym.  He is an eight-time amateur and professional world champion who is most well known for being the It's Showtime 77MAX world champion between 2008 and 2009.

On November 16, 2020 the Ministry of Foreign Affairs of Latvia imposed a travel ban against Shakuta ‘for an unspecified period’ because of his alleged involvement in the killing of peaceful protestor Raman Bandarenka. A number of sportspeople have previously identified him in photos and videos of the masked persons who attacked Bandarenka. Shakuta refused to comment on the suspicions. In the same month Estonia also imposed a travel ban against Shakuta. On 9 August 2021, Shakuta and his sports club were added to the SDN list by the United States Department of Treasury.

Biography/Career

Born in Minsk, Belarus in one of the strongest Muay Thai practicing nations on the world, Dmitry starting training in the sport aged 12 at the famous Kick Fighter Gym under the tutelage of Evgeni Kotelnikov.  He had his first competitive bout(s) aged 13 years at the 1995 C.I.S. Junior Muaythai Championships winning a silver medal at the event in Odessa, Ukraine.  Between 1995 and 1997 he would continue to do well in amateur youth competition both at home and abroad - the pinnacle being the winning of a gold medal at the W.A.K.O. world junior championships in '97.  Success at junior level was reflected in the adult amateur scene as Dmitry would win more gold medals between 1997 and 2000 encompassing three world and four European championships.

After success on the amateur circuit Shakuta decided to test himself in the professional game winning his first title - the IKF International Kickboxing Federation Intercontinental Muay Thai Title on January, 14th, 2000 in Minsk, Belarus when he defeated Fernando Calleros of Albq. New Mexico, USA by unanimous decision.

Shakuta challenged for the IKF International Kickboxing Federation Pro Muay Thai Junior Middleweight World title against Kongnapa on February 26, 2000 in Milwaukee, Wisconsin, USA. Kongnapa defeated Shakuta in a VERY CLOSE Majority decision, 48-46, 48-46 and 47-47.

He eventually won the IKF International Kickboxing Federation Pro Muay Thai Rules Super Welterweight World title when he defeated Pramuenrit Sithsaeng-a- run of Thailand by KO in Novosibirsk, Russia on June 29, 2000. 
 
He later claimed his second pro title (this time with W.A.K.O. leading him to be named the 2000 "IKF All Around Pro Fighter Of The Year".  Dmitry would continue to win titles at both amateur and professional level between 2002 and 2004, picking up three pro world titles and four gold medals in world and European championships also switching gyms in 2002 to join SK-55.  In 2003 he signed with the newly formed Thai & Kickbox SuperLeague organization and won his promotional debut at the SuperLeague Germany 2003 event easily defeating opponent Joe White.  Involvement with SuperLeague  meant that Dmitry could regularly fight against some of the world's top fighters and over the three years he was with the organization until its demise in 2006 he would post an excellent six and one record with wins against the likes of Joerie Mes, Clifton Brown and Shane Chapman only being tempered by a surprise KO loss to Moises Baptista De Sousa.

After SuperLeague ceased to exist Shakuta's record meant that he would be snapped up by the up-and-coming Dutch promotion It's Showtime and he won his debut – a four-man tournament – with the organization early 2006.  This victory meant he qualified for the organizations inaugural 75MAX tournament later that year in Rotterdam, although he did not go far after being beaten by Ondřej Hutník in the quarter finals.  In 2008 after having won a qualifying fight the previous year Dmitry found himself back at the final.  This time he went all the way beating a strong line of competitors in Rayen Simson, Sem Braan and Gregory Choplin to emerge victorious, with the victory against his early idol Simson being particularly sweet.  Later that year the winner of the 75MAX trophy and the winner of It's Showtime Reality Show faced off in Alkmaar with Dmitry defeating Sem Braan over five rounds to become the first 77MAX world champion.

Over the next couple of years Dmitry would successfully defend his 77MAX world title before losing it in early 2010 to Cosmo Alexandre.  He would also make a successful return to amateur competition winning a gold medal at the 2008 Busan TAFISA World Games.  He is currently competing in the Tatneft Arena cup in Russia and has not fought with the It's Showtime organization since losing his world title.

Shakuta defeated Sergei Papusha by unanimous decision at Mustang Knock Out Fight Night in Minsk, Belarus on November 18, 2012.

He moved up to 86 kg and lost on points to Suleyman Magomedov over five, two-minute rounds at the R-1 event in Rostov-on-Don, Russia on March 23, 2013.

Titles
Professional:
 2011 W5 World Champion -81 kg.
 2009 It's Showtime 77MAX world champion -77 kg (2nd title defence)
 2009 It's Showtime 77MAX world champion -77 kg (1st title defence)
 2008 It's Showtime 77MAX world champion -77 kg
 2008 It's Showtime Trophy Final champion -75 kg
 2006 It's Showtime 75MAX Trophy Belgium Pool B winner -75 kg
 2004 W.P.K.L. Muaythai World title -76.2 kg
 2002 World Kickboxing Network (W.K.N.) Muaythai World champion -76.2 kg
 2002 ISS/Brute Force World champion
 2000 W.A.K.O Pro World champion
 2000 I.K.F. Pro Muaythai Super-welterweight World title
 2000 I.K.F. Pro Muaythai Welterweight Intercontinental title - first pro title.
Amateur:
 2008 Busan TAFISA World Games I.F.M.A. Amateur Muaythai  -81 kg
 2002 W.A.K.O. European Championships Jesolo, Italy  -75 kg (Thai-boxing)
 2002 I.A.M.T.F. European championships Cyprus  -75 kg
 2001 W.A.K.O. World Championships in Belgrade, Serbia & Montenegro  -75 kg (Thai-boxing)
 2001 I.A.M.T.F. World Muaythai Championships, Bangkok Thailand  -75 kg
 2000 World Cup in Martial Arts Sydney, Australia  -71 kg
 2000 I.A.M.T.F. Muaythai European Championships, Athens, Greece  -71 kg
 1999 W.A.K.O. World Championships Caorle, Italy  -71 kg (Thai-boxing)
 1999 I.A.M.T.F. World Muaythai Championships, Bangkok Thailand  -60 kg
 1998 W.A.K.O. Kickboxing European Championships, Kiev, Ukraine  -60 kg
 1998 I.A.M.T.F. Muaythai European Championships, Kalafel, Spain  -57 kg
 1997 W.P.K.L. European championships Italy  -54 kg
 1997 W.A.K.O. World Junior Championships, Moscow Russia   -54 kg (Full-Contact)
 1997 World Muaythai Championships, Bangkok Thailand  -51 kg
 1995 CIS Junior Muaythai Championships, Odessa Ukraine  -42 kg

Fight record

|-
|-  bgcolor="#FFBBBB"
| 2013-09-28 || Loss ||align=left| Constantin Țuțu || KOK World GP 2013 in Chișinău, Super Fight || Chișinău, Moldova  || Extra round decision || 4 || 3:00
|-
|-  bgcolor="#FFBBBB"
| 2013-03-23 || Loss ||align=left| Suleyman Magomedov || R-1 - Fights Time || Rostov-on-Don, Russia  || Decision || 5 || 2:00
|-
! style=background:white colspan=9 |
|-
|-  bgcolor="#CCFFCC"
| 2012-11-18 || Win ||align=left| Sergei Papusha || Mustang Knock Out Fight Night || Minsk, Belarus || Decision (unanimous) || 3 || 3:00
|-
|-  bgcolor="#CCFFCC"
| 2012-04-14 || Win ||align=left| Igor Lyapin  || Fight Code || Minsk, Belarus || Decision (unanimous) || 3 || 3:00
|-
|-  bgcolor="#CCFFCC"
| 2011-12-18 || Win ||align=left| Dinu Pocrîşchin ||  || Minsk, Belarus || Decision || 3 || 3:00 
|-
|-  bgcolor="#FFBBBB"
| 2011-11-12 || Loss ||align=left| Alexander Oleinik|| Tatneft Cup 2011 Final || Kazan, Russia  || Decision (Unanimous) || 3 || 3:00
|-
|-  bgcolor="#CCFFCC"
| 2011-10-20 || Win ||align=left| Alexander Stetsurenko || W5 || Krasnodar, Russia || Decision || 3 || 3:00 
|-
! style=background:white colspan=9 |
|-
|-  bgcolor="#CCFFCC"
| 2011-07-23 || Win ||align=left| Yordan Yankov || Tatneft Cup 2011 -final (80 kg) || Kazan, Russia || Decision || 4 || 3:00 
|-
|-  bgcolor="#CCFFCC"
| 2011-05-28 || Win ||align=left| Alex Sandro Alves || Tatneft Cup 2011 -final (80 kg) || Kazan, Russia || Decision (Unanimous) || 4 || 3:00 
|-
|-  bgcolor="#CCFFCC"
| 2011-02-12 || Win ||align=left| Artem Mirovcev || Tatneft Cup 2011 -final (80 kg) || Kazan, Russia || TKO (Shoulder Injury) || 1 || 
|-
|-  bgcolor="#CCFFCC"
| 2010-05-29 || Win ||align=left| Rafal Petertil || Angel of Fire VII || Plock, Poland || KO (Flying Knee) || 2 || 
|-
|-  bgcolor="#FFBBBB"
| 2010-03-13 || Loss ||align=left| Cosmo Alexandre || Oktagon presents: It's Showtime 2010 || Milan, Italy || TKO (Doc. stop/cut by knees) || 2 ||
|-
! style=background:white colspan=9 |
|-
|-  bgcolor="#CCFFCC"
| 2009-11-21 || Win ||align=left| Sem Braan || It's Showtime 2009 Barneveld || Barneveld, Netherlands || Decision (Unanimous) || 5 || 3:00
|-
! style=background:white colspan=9 |
|-
|-  bgcolor="#FFBBBB"
| 2009-09-26 || Loss ||align=left| Artem Levin || Tatneft Arena European Cup 2009 -final (80 kg) || Kazan, Russia || KO (Left spinning backfist) || 4 || 2:08
|-  bgcolor="#CCFFCC"
| 2009-08-29 || Win ||align=left| Gregory Choplin || It's Showtime 2009 Budapest || Budapest, Hungary || Decision || 5 || 3:00
|-
! style=background:white colspan=9 |
|-
|-  bgcolor="#CCFFCC"
| 2009-05-26 || Win ||align=left| Valentin Semenov || Tatneft Arena European Cup 2009 -final (80 kg) || Kazan, Russia || Ext.R Decision (Unanimous) || 4 || 3:00
|-  bgcolor="#CCFFCC"
| 2009-02-19 || Win ||align=left| Alexey Kunchenko || Tatneft Arena European Cup 2009 -final (80 kg) || Kazan, Russia || Ext.R Decision (Unanimous) || 4 || 3:00
|-  bgcolor="#FFBBBB"
| 2008-11-01 || Loss ||align=left| Wehaj Kingboxing || Ringmaster Olimpia Tournament, semi final (82 kg) || Istanbul, Turkey || Decision || 3 || 3:00

|-  bgcolor="#CCFFCC"
| 2008-09-05 || Win ||align=left| Sem Braan || It's Showtime 2008 Alkmaar || Alkmaar, Netherlands || Decision || 5 || 3:00
|-
! style=background:white colspan=9 |
|-
|-  bgcolor="#CCFFCC"
| 2008-04-12 || Win ||align=left| Roberto Cocco || K-1 Italy Oktagon 2008 || Milan, Italy || Decision || 3 || 3:00
|-
|-  bgcolor="#CCFFCC"
| 2008-03-15 || Win ||align=left| Gregory Choplin || It's Showtime 75MAX Trophy 2008, Final || 's-Hertogenbosch, Netherlands || Decision || 3 || 3:00
|-
! style=background:white colspan=9 |
|-
|-  bgcolor="#CCFFCC"
| 2008-03-15 || Win ||align=left| Sem Braan || It's Showtime 75MAX Trophy 2008, Semi Finals || 's-Hertogenbosch, Netherlands || Decision || 3 || 3:00
|-
|-  bgcolor="#CCFFCC"
| 2008-03-15 || Win ||align=left| Rayen Simson || It's Showtime 75MAX Trophy 2008, Quarter Finals || 's-Hertogenbosch, Netherlands || Decision || 3 || 3:00
|-
|-  bgcolor="#FFBBBB"
| 2007-06-02 || Loss ||align=left| Tyrone Spong || Gentleman Fight Night IV || Tilburg, Netherlands || Decision || 5 || 3:00
|-  bgcolor="#CCFFCC"
| 2007-03-24 || Win ||align=left| Morad Sari || It's Showtime Trophy 2007 || Lommel, Belgium || Decision || 3 || 3:00
|-
! style=background:white colspan=9 |
|-
|-  bgcolor="#FFBBBB"
| 2006-09-23 || Loss ||align=left| Ondřej Hutník || It's Showtime 75MAX Trophy Final 2006, Quarter Finals || Rotterdam, Netherlands || Decision || 3 || 3:00
|-  bgcolor="#CCFFCC"
| 2006-05-13 || Win ||align=left| Shane Chapman || SuperLeague Elimination 2006 || Vienna, Austria || Decision || 3 || 3:00
|-  bgcolor="#CCFFCC"
| 2006-02-18 || Win ||align=left| Yücel Fidan || It's Showtime 75MAX Trophy Belgium, Pool B Final || Mortsel, Belgium || Decision || 3 || 3:00
|-
! style=background:white colspan=9 |
|-
|-  bgcolor="#CCFFCC"
| 2006-02-18 || Win ||align=left| Jan de Keyzer || It's Showtime 75MAX Trophy Belgium, Pool B Semi Finals || Mortsel, Belgium || TKO || 1 || 
|-
|-  bgcolor="#CCFFCC"
| 2006-01-28 || Win ||align=left| Roberto Cocco || SuperLeague Hungary 2006 || Budapest, Hungary || Decision (Unanimous) || 3 || 3:00
|-  bgcolor="#CCFFCC"
| 2005-10-22 || Win ||align=left| Emil Zoraj || SuperLeague Heavy Knockout 2005 || Vienna, Austria || Decision || 3 || 3:00
|-  bgcolor="#CCFFCC"
| 2005-09-30 || Win ||align=left| Yohan Lidon || Kings of Muaythai: Belarus vs Europe || Minsk, Belarus || Decision || 5 || 3:00
|-  bgcolor="#CCFFCC"
| 2005-05-21 || Win ||align=left| Clifton Brown || SuperLeague Germany 2005 || Oberhausen, Germany || Decision (Split) || 5 || 3:00
|-  bgcolor="#FFBBBB"
| 2005-04-09 || Loss ||align=left| Moises Baptista De Sousa || SuperLeague Austria 2005 || Vienna, Austria || KO (Punches) || 1 ||
|-  bgcolor="#CCFFCC"
| 2004-05-22 || Win ||align=left| Jiri Zak || SuperLeague Switzerland 2004 || Winterthur, Switzerland || Decision || 5 || 3:00
|-  bgcolor="#CCFFCC"
| 2004-05-04 || Win ||align=left| Mikhail Chalykh || Kristall Cup || Moscow, Russia || Decision (split) ||  || 
|-  bgcolor="#CCFFCC"
| 2004-03-27 || Win ||align=left| Ashwin Balrak || WPKL Muay Thai Champions League XII || Rotterdam, Netherlands || Decision || 5 || 3:00
|-
! style=background:white colspan=9 |
|-
|-  bgcolor="#CCFFCC"
| 2003-12-06 || Win ||align=left| Joerie Mes || SuperLeague Netherlands 2003 || Rotterdam, Netherlands || KO (Right high kick) || 2 || 2:19
|-  bgcolor="#CCFFCC"
| 2003-09-27 || Win ||align=left| Joe White || SuperLeague Germany 2003 || Wuppertal, Germany || Decision || 5 || 3:00
|-  bgcolor="#FFBBBB"
| 2003-06-18 || Loss ||align=left| Magomed Magomedov || WBKF Superfights @ Club Arbat || Moscow, Russia || Decision || 5 || 3:00
|-  bgcolor="#CCFFCC"
| 2003-03-19 || Win ||align=left| Zabit Samedov || BARS - Cup of Arbat Finals || Moscow, Russia || Decision || 5 || 3:00
|-
! style=background:white colspan=9 |
|-
|-  bgcolor="#CCFFCC"
| 2003-03-12 || Win ||align=left| Vladimir Todorov || BARS - Cup of Arbat Semifinals || Moscow, Russia || ||  || 
|-  bgcolor="#CCFFCC"
| 2003-03-06 || Win ||align=left| Alexei Kharkevich || BARS - Cup of Arbat Quarterfinals || Moscow, Russia || ||  || 
|-  bgcolor="#CCFFCC"
| 2002-12-19 || Win ||align=left| Nikolai Kovalchuk || Belarus vs Ukraine || Bilohirsk, Ukraine || Decision || 5 || 3:00
|-  bgcolor="#CCFFCC"
| 2002-09-14 || Win ||align=left| Jan Slama || Night of KO || Sopot, Poland || TKO || 5 || 3:00  
|-
! style=background:white colspan=9 |
|-
|-  bgcolor="#FFBBBB"
| 2002-07-06 || Loss ||align=left| Morad Sari || Le Grand Tournoi Quarter-final || Paris, France || Decision ||  || 3:00
|-  bgcolor="#CCFFCC"
| 2002-03-04 || Win ||align=left| Riad Rekhis || Champions League VI || Rotterdam, Netherlands || Ext. R Decision || 4 || 3:00
|-
! style=background:white colspan=9 |
|-
|-  bgcolor="#CCFFCC"
| 2002-03-04 || Win ||align=left| Chris van Venrooij || Champions League VI || Rotterdam, Netherlands || Decision || 3 || 3:00
|-  bgcolor="#CCFFCC"
| 2002-00-00 || Win ||align=left|  || WKA: BELARUS vs USA || New York, USA || ||  || 
|-  bgcolor="#CCFFCC"
| 2002-00-00 || Win ||align=left| Rodtung Wor-Taveekeat  || Brute Force Challenge || Pattaya, Thailand || Decision || 5 || 3:00
|-
! style=background:white colspan=9 |
|-
|-  bgcolor="#CCFFCC"
| 2001-05-19 || Win ||align=left| Winston Walker || || Milan, Italy || Decision ||5 || 3:00
|-
! style=background:white colspan=9 |
|-
|-  bgcolor="#FFBBBB"
| 2000-11-11 || Loss ||align=left| Pajonsuk Lookprabaht || Thailand vs Belarus || Bangkok, Thailand || Decision || 5 || 3:00
|-  bgcolor="#CCFFCC"
| 2000-00-00 || Win ||align=left| || Belarus vs Australia || Sydney, Australia || KO || ||
|-  bgcolor="#CCFFCC"
| 2000-00-00 || Win ||align=left| Nathan Keith ||  || Trieste, Italy || || ||
|-
! style=background:white colspan=9 |
|-
|-  bgcolor="#CCFFCC"
| 2000-06-29 || Win ||align=left| Pramuenrit Sithsaengarun || Russia vs Thailand || Novosibirsk, Russia || KO || ||
|-
! style=background:white colspan=9 |
|-
|-  bgcolor="#CCFFCC"
| 2000-00-00 || Win ||align=left| Lerdpipop Saengvan || Belarus vs Thailand || Minsk, Belarus || KO || ||
|-  bgcolor="#FFBBBB"
| 2000-02-26 || Loss ||align=left| Kongnapa Watcharawit||  || Milwaukee, Wisconsin || Decision (Majority) || 5 || 3:00
|-
! style=background:white colspan=9 |
|-
|-  bgcolor="#CCFFCC"
| 2000-01-14 || Win ||align=left| Fernando Calleros || USA vs Belarus || Minsk, Belarus || Decision || 5 || 3:00
|-
! style=background:white colspan=9 |
|-
|-
| colspan=9 | Legend:    

|-  bgcolor="#CCFFCC"
| 2008-10-03 || Win ||align=left| Dmitro Kirpan || 4th Busan TAFISA World Games, final || Busan, Korea || Decision || 4 || 2:00
|-
! style=background:white colspan=9 |
|-
|-  bgcolor="#CCFFCC"
| 2008-09-30 || Win ||align=left| Yordan Yankov || 4th Busan TAFISA World Games, 1/2 final || Busan, Korea || Decision || 4 || 2:00
|-  bgcolor="#CCFFCC"
| 2008-09-29 || Win ||align=left| Nima Maijidi || 4th Busan TAFISA World Games, 1/4 final || Busan, Korea || KO || || 
|-  bgcolor="#CCFFCC"
| 2008-09-27 || Win ||align=left| Marcin Tomczyk || 4th Busan TAFISA World Games, 1/8 final || Busan, Korea || Decision || 4 || 2:00
|-
| colspan=9 | Legend:

See also 
List of K-1 events
List of It's Showtime champions
List of male kickboxers

References 

1980 births
Living people
Belarusian male kickboxers
Welterweight kickboxers
Middleweight kickboxers
Light heavyweight kickboxers
Belarusian Muay Thai practitioners
Sportspeople from Minsk
Belarusian individuals subject to the U.S. Department of the Treasury sanctions